Marjorie Ann "Marge" Jones Devaney (March 3, 1931 – September 20, 2007) was an American mathematician, electrical engineer, and computer scientist who assisted in the development of the MANIAC I (Mathematical Analyzer Numerical Integrator And Computer) computer in 1951 as a member of the Theoretical Division at the Los Alamos National Laboratory, making her one of world's earliest computer programmers.

Life and education 
Marjorie Devaney was the child of farmers from Wisconsin who lost their money and possessions in the Wall Street Crash of 1929. Soon after, her family relocated to California where her father had a job arranged as a gravestone manufacturer. Devaney was born in Bell, California in March 1931, making her the youngest of three children (one brother and one sister). At age four, her family moved to Pomona, California where Devaney spent her childhood years and graduated high school. Devaney started her college education at the University of Denver in September 1948. She graduated in August 1951 with a bachelor's degree in mathematics. In the early 1970s, Devaney began post-graduate studies at the University of New Mexico–Los Alamos (UNMLA). She completed graduate school with a master's degree in computer science and electrical engineering. Devaney married Joseph James Devaney, and together they had one daughter. Devaney died in Los Alamos, New Mexico on September 20, 2007, and left behind her husband whose death occurred three days later.

Career 
Marjorie Devaney began her career on October 8, 1951 at the Los Alamos National Laboratory in Los Alamos, New Mexico. She joined the MANIAC I program as a member of the Theoretical Division under the leadership of Nicholas Metropolis and Jack Johnson. The Theoretical Division eventually became the Computing Division, where she worked for forty years. She retired in 1991 having made a number of contributions to the MANIAC I and MANIAC II programs. Her most notable work includes the co-creation of a central file system (CFS) used at the laboratory in Los Alamos, a task which took more than a decade to complete. Devaney wrote and co-wrote several publications primarily related to mathematics and programming. Additionally, Devaney's work is referenced in numerous, independent publications.

Publications 
 Devaney, Marjorie, and Jeanne Hudgins. "The Terminal Control Language for the Madcap Programming Language." ACM SIGPLAN Notices 7, no. 10 (1972): 130–36.
 Richtmyer, R., Devaney, M., and Metropolis, N. "Continued Fraction Expansions of Algebraic Numbers." Numerische Mathematik 4, no. 1 (1962): 68–84.
 Devaney, Joseph J., Leona O. Bordwell, and Marjorie J. Devaney. Hafnium Cross Sections and Their Temperature Dependence. Los Alamos, NM: Los Alamos Scientific Laboratory of the University of California, 1962.
Bordwell, Lee, Joseph J. Devaney, Marjorie Devaney, Bertha Fagan, and Max Goldstein. TEWA: An IBM Code for Computing the Maxwellian Doppler Broadening of Breit-Wigner Resonances. Los Alamos, NM: Los Alamos Scientific Laboratory of the University of California, 1964.

References

Further reading
 

1931 births
2007 deaths
20th-century American mathematicians
20th-century women mathematicians
Los Alamos National Laboratory personnel
American computer programmers
American electrical engineers
American women engineers
People from Bell, California
University of Denver alumni
University of New Mexico alumni
American women mathematicians
Mathematicians from California
20th-century American women
21st-century American women